Leuronoma is a genus of moths in the family Gelechiidae. Most species of this genus are found in Africa.

Species
Some species of this genus are:
Leuronoma chlorotoma Meyrick, 1918
Leuronoma eodryas (Meyrick, 1918)
Leuronoma fauvella Viette, 1957
Leuronoma magna Janse, 1958
Leuronoma nigridorsis Meyrick, 1921
Leuronoma oenochyta (Meyrick, 1921)
Leuronoma textifera (Meyrick, 1913)
Leuronoma veterascens Meyrick, 1918
Leuronoma vinolenta Meyrick, 1919
Leuronoma zymotis (Meyrick, 1909)

References

 
Gelechiini